This is a list of persons who served aboard Space Shuttle crews, arranged in chronological  order by Space Shuttle missions.

Abbreviations:
 PC = Payload Commander
 MSE = USAF Manned Spaceflight Engineer
 Mir = Launched to be part of the crew of the Mir Space Station
 ISS = Launched to be part of the crew of the International Space Station.

Names of astronauts returning from the Mir or ISS on the Space Shuttle are shown in italics.  They did not have specific crew roles, but are listed in the Payload Specialist columns for reasons of space.

Only two flights have carried more than seven crew members for either launch or landing. STS-61-A in 1985 is the only flight to have both launched and landed with a crew of eight, and STS-71 in 1995 is the only other flight to have landed with a crew of eight.

1977

* Note 1: In this year, Approach and Landing Tests (ALT) were accomplished. These were atmospheric only, non-spaceflight tests from a Boeing 747 Shuttle Carrier Aircraft, both with the orbiter attached and for a series of drop-test flights.

** Note 2: The durations listed count only the orbiter free-flight time, and not total time aloft along with airborne time atop of the 747 SCA.

*** Note 3: Flights with the orbiter attached to the SCA for the duration, but both crewed and powered to test crew procedures and orbiter systems.

1981–1985

1986–1990

1991–1995

1996–2000

2001–2005

2006–2011

See also
 List of Space Shuttle missions
 Space Shuttle program

External links
Spacefacts.de - List of crews scheduled for future human spaceflight

Space Shuttle program
Space Shuttle crews
Astronauts by space program